Bode Hidalgo (born February 22, 2002, as Bode Davis) is an American soccer player who plays as a forward for Real Salt Lake in Major League Soccer.

Career 
Davis appeared for USL Championship side Real Monarchs as an academy player on July 11, 2020, starting in a 1–0 loss to San Diego Loyal. Davis signed a professional deal with Real Monarchs on July 16, 2020.

September 9, 2020, Davis scored his first professional goal for Real Monarchs in a match against Colorado Springs Switchbacks FC. On September 22, 2020, it was announced that Davis would sign a homegrown player deal with Real Salt Lake for the 2021 season and beyond.

Davis made his MLS debut on March 19, 2022, against Nashville SC. He scored his first goal for the club on October 9, 2022, in a 3–1 win over the Portland Timbers.

Personal life
Bode was born in Kaysville, Utah to Shane and Ami Davis. He changed his name to Bode Hidalgo in 2022.

References

External links 
 USL Championship bio

2002 births
Living people
People from Sandy, Utah
Soccer players from Utah
American soccer players
Association football forwards
Homegrown Players (MLS)
Real Monarchs players
Real Salt Lake players
USL Championship players
Major League Soccer players
MLS Next Pro players
People from Kaysville, Utah